Pacific Strike is a World War II combat flight simulation video game developed by Origin Systems and released by Electronic Arts for DOS in 1994. The game follows the pattern of the Wing Commander series, although it has a greater resemblance to its cousin Strike Commander in the sense that it is set in a more or less contemporary setting and allows the player to fly actual planes. The game, just like the above-mentioned titles, mixes aerial simulation with a cinematic plot structured through a series of cutscenes that play between missions. Unlike the above-mentioned titles, Pacific Strike was only released in a floppy disk version, while the others were released had CD-ROM versions featuring improved cut-scenes and more digitized speech. A remake, Zero Pilot: Ginyoku no Senshi, was released in Japan for the PlayStation in 1998.

Plot
Gameplay is very similar to Origin's Strike Commander. Unlike it or the Wing Commander series, Pacific Strike immerses the player into a real historical context as an American pilot during the months following the Japanese attack on Pearl Harbor, flying aircraft from a carrier and performing missions like reconnaissance, intercepting enemy planes or attacking enemy vessels. If the player does well it is possible to defeat the Empire of Japan without recourse to the atomic bomb. Extremely poor performance could result in the defeat of the United States Navy and the ceding of Hawaii to the Empire.

Reception
Computer Gaming World rated Pacific Strike 1.5 stars out of five. Reporting that Origin apologized on CompuServe for the game's problems, the magazine cited poor performance and mediocre graphics compared to 1942: The Pacific Air War, and weak sound, and said that the game needed "deep and fundamental changes".

In 1996, Computer Gaming World declared Pacific Strike the 17th-worst computer game ever released.

References

External links

1994 video games
Combat flight simulators
DOS games
DOS-only games
Origin Systems games
Pacific War video games
Video games developed in the United States
Video games set in Hawaii
Video games set in Japan
Video games set in the Marshall Islands
Video games set in Oceania
Video games set in the Solomon Islands
World War II flight simulation video games